Lordhowea is a monotypic genus of Australian araneomorph spiders in the family Cyatholipidae containing the single species, Lordhowea nesiota. It was first described by C. E. Griswold in 2001, and has only been found in Australia.

References

Cyatholipidae
Spiders described in 2001
Spiders of Australia